Nototriton richardi commonly known as Richard's salamander is a species of salamander in the family Plethodontidae. It is endemic to the Cordillera Central, Costa Rica.

Its natural habitat is tropical moist montane forests. It is threatened by habitat loss.

Citations

Sources

Further reading
 

Nototriton
Amphibians of Costa Rica
Endemic fauna of Costa Rica
Taxonomy articles created by Polbot
Amphibians described in 1949